Flip Smit is a South African demographer and former Vice Chancellor and Principal of the University of Pretoria. His research on the urbanisation of the black population in South Africa provided scientific proof in the early 1980s that separate development (apartheid), as applied by the Government of the day, could not work.

Biography 

From 1966 to 1971 Smit was a researcher and later head of research at the Africa Institute of South Africa. At the request of the South African Government he and Prof G.M. Leistner conducted a feasibility study on moving Malawi's capital to Lilongwe. In 1972 he was appointed professor and head of the department of geography at University of South Africa.

Smit served as senior deputy president at the Human Sciences Research Council before being appointed as Vice Chancellor and Principal of the University of Pretoria in 1992. After a term of five years he returned to his research in demography and retired in 2000.
He is the author or co-author of six books and more than 120 articles published in scientific journals.

Education  

Smit was awarded his Masters in Geography from the University of Stellenbosch in 1961, and his Ph.D. from the University of South Africa in 1965.

Research 

Smit's most important research contributions were in the field of demographics. He worked on population migration, specifically on the urbanisation of the black population in South Africa. The research results served as guidelines for socio-political planning by the government and private institutions, but as far back as the early eighties, provided scientific proof that separate development (apartheid), as applied by the government of the day, was not sustainable. 
His knowledge of demographics also enabled Smit to play an important role in establishing the nine provinces of South Africa and the drawing of their boundaries in 1993. In addition to research in demography he also undertook research on higher education.

Awards and accolades 

Among Smit's many accolades are the Percy Fox Foundation Award for outstanding contributions in the field of migration, urbanisation and housing; the Vice Chancellor's medal for outstanding contributions to the University of Pretoria and a medal as one of the University's 100 leading minds; and honorary doctorates from the University of Pretoria, the University of Stellenbosch and the Moscow Business University.

See also
List of Chancellors and Vice-Chancellors of the University of Pretoria

References 

1936 births
Living people
Vice-Chancellors of the University of Pretoria
South African demographers
Stellenbosch University alumni
University of South Africa alumni